Donald Rusk Currey (January 24, 1934 – June 6, 2004) was an American professor of geography. While known in academia for his extensive research and exploration of relics of the ancient Lake Bonneville in the eastern Great Basin, he was best known to the public for his controversial felling of Prometheus, the oldest living non-clonal organism known at the time, while a graduate student in 1964.

Prometheus controversy

Discovery and felling

In 1963, Currey was a graduate student at the University of North Carolina at Chapel Hill. Under a fellowship from the National Science Foundation, Currey was studying the climate dynamics of the Little Ice Age using dendrochronology techniques.

The Bristlecone pines that grow in California,  Nevada and Utah were discovered to be older than any species yet dated, and in 1963 Currey became aware of a Great Basin Bristlecone Pine population in the Snake Range and on Wheeler Peak in eastern Nevada in particular. At the time he visited the area, in the summer of 1964, he did not know that previous researchers had examined the area. Based on the size, growth rate and growth forms of some of the trees he became convinced that some very old specimens existed on the mountain and, using the scientific methods of the time, Currey began taking core samples to check. He found that some exceeded 3000 years in age, taking particular interest in a tree he designated WPN-114, the previously named Prometheus.

Currey was unable to obtain a continuous series of overlapping cores from WPN-114: he had tried at least four times with a 28 inch long borer, breaking two borers, but to no avail. He decided to ask for permission from the United States Forest Service to fell the tree. He was already acquainted with Forest Service officials at the nearby Lehman Caves National Monument (now a part of the much larger Great Basin National Park which includes the area Currey was working in), and made a request with Donald E. Cox, a district Forest Service ranger, for permission to cut down the tree in order to examine the whole trunk in cross-section. Cox felt that the request was scientifically sound and, after convincing superiors that the particular tree was not a notable landmark, gained approval for felling it.

After securing permission, Cox informed Currey and assigned a Forest Service crew to join the young researcher and bring back the samples. The tree was cut and sectioned on August 6, 1964, and several pieces of the sections hauled out to be processed and analyzed, first by Currey, then, later, by others. To their surprise, the tree was not only old, but older than any other non-clonal organism known until 2013, when the Methuselah tree passed the age of Prometheus.

Aftermath 
It took a few years for the information about the felling of Prometheus to reach the public, but once it did there was great controversy. Most criticism centered on the U.S. Forest Service's decision to permit the tree to be cut. Further, some critics questioned how the cutting of such an old tree was necessary given the topic Currey was studying. Since the Little Ice Age started no more than 600 years ago, many trees could presumably have provided the information he was after for that time period. However, in Currey's original report (Currey, 1965) he refers to the Little Ice Age as encompassing the period from 2000 BC to the present, thus defining the Age over a much longer time period than is currently accepted. Whether this was the common sentiment at the time is not known. In the article, Currey indicates that he sectioned the tree as much from the question of whether the oldest bristlecones were necessarily confined to California's White Mountains (as some dendrochronologists had been claiming) as from its usefulness in regard to studies of the Little Ice Age.

The incident led to a tighter restriction on the felling of old trees, the eventual creation of Great Basin National Park (now overseen by the National Park Service), and the decision to hide the exact location of Methuselah, the tree believed to be the oldest at that time. Currey personally took part in lobbying efforts to get Congress to designate the area a part of a national park.

Later career 
Currey went on to a successful academic career. By the time his paper on his finding was published in the journal Ecology, he had become a member of the faculty at Chapel Hill. He went on to earn his Ph.D. in 1969 from the University of Kansas and joined the faculty of the Department of Geography at the University of Utah in 1970, becoming full and later Professor Emeritus. 

He spent over two decades researching and exploring relics of ancient Lake Bonneville in the eastern Great Basin. His papers on Lake Bonneville became the most cited papers in his department. His work examined the geomorphology of lakes, paleolakes, lake basins, and coasts; paleolimnology and geochronology of Quaternary lakes; geodynamics of Quaternary lakes; geoarchaeology; and desert, mountain, and Arctic environmental change.

Death 
Currey died at age 70 on June 6, 2004, shortly after being hospitalized for a sudden illness. He was honored during the 2005 Annual Meeting of the Association of American Geographers, with an annual field trip by The Geological Society of America, and the University of Utah Department of Geography established a scholarship in his name.

References

External links
 The "Prometheus" Story, Great Basin Online, National Park Service, August 2, 2002, Accessed July 24, 2010.

1934 births
2004 deaths
University of Kansas alumni
University of North Carolina at Chapel Hill alumni
University of Utah faculty